Richie Stephen Anderson (born 13 October 1987) is a TV and radio personality who works for the BBC. He is a former Sunday League footballer who played for Coombs Wood F.C.

Anderson currently presents the travel reports on weekday mornings on BBC Radio 2. In 2022 he participated in series 20 of Strictly Come Dancing.

BBC WM
He presented his own show on BBC WM, where he started his radio career, on Saturdays between August 2015 and March 2020. He had previously stood in for other presenters during early 2015. Before becoming a presenter, Anderson was a reporter for BBC WM during their football segments on matchdays. Dubbed "Roaming Richie", he would interview fans before and after matches. He became renowned during this period for his vox pop 'man on the street' style of interviewing.

BBC Radio 2
Since January 2019, Anderson has been the weekday mornings travel news reporter on BBC Radio 2 during The Radio 2 Breakfast Show with Zoe Ball and Gary Davies's mid-morning show. He replaced Rachel Horne who moved to Virgin Radio. Anderson also occasionally presents special programmes on Bank Holidays for Radio 2.

The One Show
Anderson occasionally reports on various topics for The One Show on BBC One. Richie has also contributed as a guest reviewer on Strictly Come Dancing: It Takes Two on  BBC Two.

Personal life
In 2018, Anderson came out as gay to his teammates after playing a game of football, as part of a film for BBC's The One Show, highlighting the pressures of homophobia in the sport.

In 2020, Anderson, along with fellow Radio 2 presenters Jo Whiley and Kate Bottley, participated in three triathlons in three days to raise money for Sport Relief as part of their Dare To Tri campaign.

References

External links
 

Living people
BBC Radio 2 presenters
1987 births
British LGBT broadcasters
Alumni of Leeds Trinity University
People from Smethwick